is a railway station in Nishikan-ku, Niigata, Niigata Prefecture, Japan, operated by East Japan Railway Company (JR East).

Lines
Maki Station is served by the Echigo Line, and is 57.8 kilometers from the starting point of the line at Kashiwazaki Station.

Layout

The station consists of two ground-level opposed side platforms connected by a footbridge, serving two tracks.

The station has a "Midori no Madoguchi" staffed ticket office.  Suica farecard can be used at this station.

Platforms

Passenger statistics
In fiscal 2017, the station was used by an average of 2394 passengers daily (boarding passengers only).

Surrounding area
 
 Nisihkan-ku Ward Office
 Maki General High School
 Maki High School

See also
 List of railway stations in Japan

References

External links

 JR East station information 

Railway stations in Niigata (city)
Railway stations in Japan opened in 1912
Stations of East Japan Railway Company
Echigo Line